St. John's Senior Secondary School is one of the oldest English medium schools in Meerut, Uttar Pradesh, India. The school is co-educational and is affiliated to the Central Board of Secondary Education, New Delhi.
Principal Mrs. Chandrlekha Jain is one among the most known principals of Meerut.
It is one of the most reputed schools and well known for its various victories in various competitions. 
It gives options to study three main streams like Commerce, Science, Humanities. St. John's is known for being the institution that is constantly providing its best education to students.

History

1830 to 1881
The Free or Station School for Regimental children was started in 1830 and remained on Government grant till 1874. There were no public schools at Meerut for the non-regimental population from 1874 to 1881. Private schools were attempted but none succeeded and the want of a good school was strongly felt. This was closed in 1874.

1881 to 1890
In July 1881, a Girls Upper School was started by Miss Snelleking in Soldier's Chapel. Miss Snelleking's school with 27 children was handed over to the Chaplain of Meerut in January 1882 and was named St. John's Girls Upper School. Two more branches of St. John's School were opened in April 1882 in a rented bungalow on Boundary Road belonging to Mr Becon. The schools were named St. John's Boys Upper School and St. John's Lower School respectively. All three schools catered for the children of middle and lower classes who could not afford to provide English medium education to their wards by sending them to expensive Hill Boarding schools.

1890 to present
In July 1890, the rented bungalow on the Boundary Road was vacated and children were shifted to the Soldier's Chapel. The three branches of the school were merged and named St. John's School. In July 1891, the school was shifted to Begum Sumroo's Chapel on 117 Bank Street, the present location of the school. 

The school is affiliated to the Central Board of Secondary Education, New Delhi and is a co-educational institution. Students from 2.5 years to 18 years study in the school.

A memorable principal of the school was Mr.C.H Herbert who was ordained as a priest in the Church of North India and officiated at the St. John's Church at Meerut Cantt. After him came Mr.C.V. Ellis who served the institution as a Principal. Mr. D.V.S Chauhan then served as the acting principal. Mr. Chauhan was succeeded by Mr. S.V. Prasad. The current principal of the school is Mrs. Chandralekha Jain.

External links

Christian schools in Uttar Pradesh
Primary schools in Uttar Pradesh
High schools and secondary schools in Uttar Pradesh
Schools in Meerut
Educational institutions established in 1881
1881 establishments in India